Fitzroy Simpson (born 26 February 1970) is a former professional footballer who played as a midfielder and left back from 1988 to 2008.

Simpson played in the Premier League for Manchester City, in the Scottish Premier League for Heart of Midlothian, in the Football League for Swindon Town, Bristol City, Portsmouth and Walsall, in the Irish Premier League for Linfield, and ended his career in non-league football with Telford United, Havant & Waterlooville and Eastleigh. Born in England, he represented Jamaica internationally.

Club career
Simpson was born in Bradford-on-Avon, Wiltshire, joined the youth team at nearby Swindon Town in 1987, and signed a professional contract the next year. In his debut match he was sent off for punching an opponent. Before the 1992–93 season he was sold to Premier League club Manchester City for £500,000. After a couple of seasons he struggled to stay in the first eleven, went on loan to Bristol City and was finally transferred to Portsmouth, where he played until 1999.

Heart of Midlothian signed Simpson soon after the World Cup, but it was an unhappy move, and he was offered the chance to reignite his career under Ray Graydon at Walsall. Simpson helped to revive the club's season, helping them to reach the Football League Second Division play-off final, which they went on to win. However, Simpson missed this game after picking up an injury during the semi-final. He left Walsall in the summer of 2003.

In 2003–04 he played non-league football with Telford United. He then went to play for Linfield in Northern Ireland but was released in the end of June 2005, at 35 years old.

He then announced his intention to retire from football, moving to the Costa del Sol, taking a directorship in a property firm, but in the 2005–06 season he resumed his football career with Havant & Waterlooville. He arrived at Eastleigh in October 2007 from Havant. He left the club at the end of the season and retired from football.

International career
Simpson won 43 caps for Jamaica from 1997 to 2003 and scored 3 goals. He represented the 'Reggae Boyz' in all three group stage matches at the 1998 FIFA World Cup. Simpson captained his final international match.

Career statistics
Scores and results list Jamaica's goal tally first, score column indicates score after each Simpson goal.

References

External links
 

1970 births
Living people
Jamaican footballers
1998 CONCACAF Gold Cup players
1998 FIFA World Cup players
Swindon Town F.C. players
Manchester City F.C. players
Bristol City F.C. players
Portsmouth F.C. players
Heart of Midlothian F.C. players
Walsall F.C. players
Telford United F.C. players
Linfield F.C. players
Havant & Waterlooville F.C. players
Premier League players
English people of Jamaican descent
Jamaica international footballers
Scottish Premier League players
English Football League players
National League (English football) players
Eastleigh F.C. players
Association football midfielders
People from Bradford-on-Avon